The following is a list of destroyers and 1st class (steam) torpedo boats of Japan grouped by class or design. Each ship's name is followed by its launch date in brackets. In naval terminology, a destroyer is a fast and maneuverable yet long-endurance warship intended to escort larger vessels in a fleet, convoy or battle group and defend them against smaller, powerful, short-range attackers. The Japanese torpedo boat  of 1885 was "the forerunner of torpedo boat destroyers that appeared a decade later". They were designed to Japanese specifications and ordered from the London Yarrow shipyards in 1885. The Yarrow shipyards, builder of the parts for the Kotaka, "considered Japan to have effectively invented the destroyer".

Imperial Japanese Navy

Russo-Japanese War
These twenty-three 'turtle-back' destroyers, all authorised under the Ten Year Naval Expansion Programme of 1898, comprised six Ikazuchi class built by Yarrow and six Murakumo class built by Thornycroft in the UK, each carrying 1–12pdr (aft) and 5–6pdr guns and 2–18in torpedo tubes, and followed by two larger ships from each of the same builders (the Shirakumo class from Thornycroft and the Akatsuki class from Yarrow), in which a second 12pdr replaced the foremost 6pdr, and finally by seven Harusame class built in Japan. All were later rated as 3rd Class destroyers (under 600 tons each). The Programme also included sixteen First Class torpedo boats, included below (47 smaller 2nd and 3rd Class boats from this Programme are not included)

— 6 ships

 Murakumo (16 November 1898)
 Shinonome (14 December 1898)
 Yūgiri (26 January 1899)

 Shiranui (14 March 1899)
 Kagero (23 August 1899)
 Usugumo (16 October 1900)

— 6 ships

 Ikazuchi (15 November 1898)
 Inazuma (28 January 1899)
 Akebono (25 April 1899)

  (8 August 1899)
 Niji (22 June 1899)
 Oboro (5 October 1899)

Shirataka class - 1 1st class torpedo boat
 Shirataka (10 June 1899)

Hayabusa class - 15 1st class torpedo boats

 Hayabusa (1899)
 Kasasagi (1900)
 Manazuru (1900)
 Chidori (1901)
 Aotaka (February 1903)
 Kari (14 March 1903)
 Hato (July 1903)
 Tsubame (August 1903)

 Hibari (October 1903)
 Kiji (November 1903)
 Hashitaka (December 1903)
 Sagi (December 1903
 Uzura (February 1904)
 Kamone (April 1904)
 Ōtori (April 1904)

— 2 ships

 Shirakumo (1 October 1901)

 Asashio (10 January 1902)

Akatsuki class — 2 ships

 Akatsuki (13 November 1901)

 Kasumi (23 January 1902)

— 7 ships

 Harusame (31 October 1902)
 Murasame (29 November 1902)
 Hayatori (12 March 1903)
 Asagiri (15 April 1903)

 Ariake (7 December 1904)
 Fubuki (21 January 1905)
 Arare (5 April 1905)

World War I
Before and during World War I, Japan established three grades of destroyers - the large (over 1,000 tons) 1st Class or ocean-going type, the medium (600 to 1,000 tons) 2nd Class type and the small (below 600 tons) 3rd Class type. Between 1904 and 1918, Japan built thirty-two 3rd Class destroyers (the Kamikaze class), twenty-two 2nd Class destroyers (the Sakura, Kaba, Momo and Enoki classes) and eight 1st Class destroyers (the Umikaze, Isokaze and Kawakaze classes). They also purchased two further 1st Class destroyers (the Urakaze class) built in the UK by Yarrow.

Kamikaze class — 32 ships

 Kamikaze (15 July 1905)
 Hatsushimo (13 May 1905)
 Yayoi (7 August 1905)
 Kisaragi (19 October 1905)
 Asakaze (28 October 1905)
 Shiratsuyu (12 February 1906)
 Shirayuki (12 October 1906)
 Matsukaze (23 December 1906)
 Harukaze (25 December 1905)
 Shigure (12 March 1906)
 Asatsuyu (2 April 1906)
 Hayate (22 May 1906)
 Oite (10 January 1906)
 Yūnagi (22  August 1906)
 Yūgure (17 November 1905)
 Yūdachi (26 March 1906)

 Mikazuki (26 May 1906)
 Nowaki (25 July 1906)
 Ushio (30 August 1905)
 Nenohi (30 August 1905)
 Hibiki (31 March 1906)
 Shirotae (30 July 1906)
 Hatsuharu (21 May 1906)
 Wakaba (25 November 1906)
 Hatsuyuki (8 March 1906)
 Uzuki (20 September 1906)
 Minatsuki (5 November 1906)
 Nagatsuki (15 December 1906)
 Kikutsuki (10 April 1907)
 Uranami (8 December 1907)
 Isonami (21 November 1908)
 Ayanami (20 March 1909)

— 2 ships

 Umikaze (10 October 1910)

 Yamakaze (21 January 1911)

— 2 ships

 Sakura (20 December 1911)

 Tachibana (27 January 1912)

— 10 ships

 Kaba (6 February 1915)
 Kashiwa (14 February 1915)
 Sakaki (4 March 1915)
 Katsura (15 February 1915)
 Sugi (16 February 1915)

 Kaede (20 February 1915)
 Ume (27 February 1915)
 Kiri (28 February 1915)
 Kusunoki (5 March 1915)
 Matsu (5 March 1915)

— 2 ships

 Urakaze (16 February 1915)

Kawakaze (27 September 1915)

— 4 ships

 Momo (12 October 1916)
 Kashi (1 December 1916)

 Hinoki (25 December 1916)
 Yanagi (24 February 1917)

— 4 ships

 Isokaze (5 October 1916)
 Amatsukaze (5 October 1916)

 Hamakaze (30 October 1916)
 Tokitsukaze (27 December 1917)

/Kanran class - 2 ships 
(both ships loaned from the Royal Navy from June 1917 to 1919)

 Kanran (ex HMS Nemesis - launched 9 August 1910)

 Sendan (ex HMS Minstrel - launched 2 February 1911)

— 2 ships

 Kawakaze (10 October 1917)

 Tanikaze (20 July 1918)

— 6 ships

 Enoki (5 March 1918)
 Maki (28 December 1917)
 Nara (28 March 1918)

 Keyaki (15 January 1918)
 Kuwa (23 February 1918)
 Tsubaki (23 February 1918)

The Inter-War Period
From 1919 onwards, a series of destroyers were built regularly in Japan. No further 3rd Class ships were built after 1909, and only two further classes of 2nd Class ships (the Momi and Wakatake classes) were built by 1923, after which all were 1st Class. The ships of the Wakatake, Kamikaze and Mutsuki classes were initially given numbers rather than names, but names were assigned on 1 August 1928. The numbering system continued after 1928, but were not assigned to ships, which were all named.

— 21 ships 
The total of 21 excludes 7 cancelled.

 Momi (10 June 1919)
 Kaya (10 June 1919)
 Nire (22 December 1919)
 Kuri (19 March 1920)
 Nashi (26 August 1919)
 Take (26 August 1919)
 Kaki (20 October 1919)
 Tsuga (17 April 1920)
 Kiku (13 October 1920)
 Aoi (9 December 1920)
 Hagi (29 October 1920)

 Susuki (21 February 1921)
 Fuji (27 November 1920)
 Tsuta (9 May 1921)
 Ashi (3 September 1921)
 Hishi (9 May 1921)
 Hasu (8 December 1921)
 Sumire (14 December 1921)
 Yomogi (14 March 1922)
 Warabi (28 September 1921)
 Tade (15 March 1921)

— 15 ships

 Minekaze (8 February 1919)
 Sawakaze (7 January 1919)
 Okikaze (3 October 1919)
 Shimakaze (31 March 1920)
 Nadakaze (26 June 1920)
 Yakaze (10 April 1920)
 Hakaze (21 June 1920)
 Shiokaze (22 October 1920)

 Akikaze (14 December 1920)
 Yūkaze (28 April 1921)
 Tachikaze (31 March 1921)
 Hokaze (12 July 1921)
 Nokaze (1 October 1921)
 Namikaze (24 June 1922)
 Numakaze (22 May 1922)

— 8 ships 
The total of 8 excludes 5 cancelled in 1922.
( lost in December 1932; leaving 7 which served in the Pacific War)

 No.2/Wakatake (24 July 1922)
 No.4/Kuretake (21 October 1922)
 No.6/Sanae (15 February 1923)
 No.8/Sawarabi (1 September 1923)
 No.10/Asagao (4 November 1922)
 No.12/Yūgao (14 April 1923)
 No.14/Kijiko (cancelled 1922)

 No.16/Fuyō (22 September 1922)
 No.18/Karukaya (19 March 1923)
 No.20/Omadaka (cancelled 1922)
 No.22/Nadeshiko (cancelled 1922)
 No.24/Botan (cancelled 1922)
 No.26/Basho (cancelled 1922)

Kamikaze class — 9 ships

 No.1/Kamikaze (25 September 1922)
 No.3/Asakaze (8 December 1922)
 No.5/Harukaze (18 December 1922)
 No.7/Matsukaze (30 October 1923)
 No.9/Hatakaze (15 March 1924)

 No.11/Oite (27 November 1924)
 No.13/Hayate (23 March 1925)
 No.15/Asanagi (21 April 1924)
 No.17/Yūnagi (23 April 1924)

— 12 ships

 No.19/Mutsuki (23 July 1925)
 No.21/Kisaragi (5 June 1925)
 No.23/Yayoi (11 July 1925)
 No.25/Uzuki (15 October 1925)
 No.27/Satsuki (25 March 1925)
 No.28/Minazuki (25 May 1926)

 No.29/Fumitsuki (16 February 1926)
 No.30/Nagatsuki (6 October 1926)
 No.31/Kikutsuki (15 May 1926)
 No.32/Mikatsuki (12 July 1926)
 No.33/Mochitsuki (28 April 1927)
 No.34/Yūzuki (4 March 1927)

(Special Type)— 20 ships
( lost in 1934, leaving 19 which served in the Pacific War)

 (No.35)/Fubuki (15 November 1927)
 (No.36)/Shirayuki (20 March 1928)
 (No.37)/Hatsuyuki (29 September 1928)
 (No.38)/Miyuki (26 June 1928)
 (No.39)/Murakumo (27 September 1928)
 (No.40)/Shinonome (26 November 1927)
 (No.41)/Usugumo (26 December 1927)
 (No.42)/Shirakumo (27 December 1927)
 (No.43)/Isonami (24 November 1927)
 (No.44)/Uranami (29 November 1928)

 (No.45)/Ayanami (5 October 1929)
 (No.46)/Shikinami (22 June 1929)
 (No.47)/Asagiri (18 November 1929)
 (No.48)/Yūgiri (12 May 1930)
 (No.49)/Amagiri (27 February 1930)
 (No.50)/Sagiri (23 December 1929)
 (No.51)/Oboro (8 November 1930)
 (No.52)/Akebono (7 November 1930)
 (No.53)/Sazanami (6 June 1931)
 (No.54)/Ushio (17 November 1930)

Akatsuki class — 4 ships

 (No.55)/Akatsuki (7 May 1932)
 (No.56)/Hibiki (22 December 1932)

 (No.57)/Ikazuchi (22 October 1931)
 (No.58)/Inazuma (25 February 1932)

— 6 ships

 (No.59)/Hatsuharu (27 February 1933)
 (No.60)/Nenohi (22 December 1932
 (No.61)/Wakaba (18 March 1934)

 (No.62)/Hatsushimo (4 November 1933
 (No.63)/Ariake (23 September 1934)
 (No.64)/Yūgure (6 May 1934)

— 4 ships
These four vessels were nominally "torpedo boats". Built under the 1st Naval Armaments Supplement Programme of 1931.

 Chidori (1 April 1933)
 Manazuru (11 July 1933)

 Tomozuru (1 October 1933)
 Hatsukari (19 December 1933)

The Second Sino-Japanese War and World War II

— 8 ships
These eight vessels were nominally "torpedo boats". The total of 8 excludes another 8 cancelled units.

 Ōtori (25 April 1935)
 Kasasagi (28 October 1935)
 Hiyodori (25 October 1935)
 Hayabusa (28 October 1935)

 Hato (25 January 1937)
 Sagi (30 January 1937)
 Kari (20 January 1937)
 Kiji (26 January 1937)

— 10 ships

 (No.65)/Shiratsuyu (5 April 1935)
 (No.66)/Shigure (18 May 1935)
 (No.67)/Murasame (20 June 1935) 
 (No.68)/Yūdachi (21 June 1936)
 (No.69)/Harusame (21 September 1935)

 (No.70)/Samidare (6 July 1935)
 (No.71)/Umikaze (27 November 1936)
 (No.72)/Yamakaze (21 February 1936)
 (No.73)/Kawakaze (1 November 1936)
 (No.74)/Suzukaze (11 March 1937)

— 10 ships

 (No.75)/Asashio (16 December 1936)
 (No.76)/Ōshio (19 April 1937)
 (No.77)/Michishio (15 March 1937)
 (No.78)/Arashio (26 May 1937)
 (No.79)/Yamagumo (24 July 1937)

 (No.80)/Natsugumo (26 May 1937)
 (No.81)/Asagumo (5 November 1937)
 (No.82)/Minegumo (4 November 1937)
 (No.83)/Arare (16 November 1937)
 (No.84)/Kasumi (18 November 1937)

(Type A) — 19 ships

 (No.85)/Kagerō (27 September 1938)
 (No.86)/Shiranui (28 June 1938)
 (No.87)/Kuroshio (25 October 1938)
 (No.88)/Oyashio (29 November 1938)
 (No.89)/Hayashio (19 April 1939)
 (No.90)/Natsushio (23 February 1939)
 (No.91)/Hatsukaze (24 January 1939)
 (No.92)/Yukikaze (24 March 1939)
 (No.93)/Amatsukaze (19 October 1939)
 (No.94)/Tokitsukaze (10 November 1939)

 (No.95)/Urakaze (19 April 1940)
 (No.96)/Isokaze (19 June 1939)
 (No.97)/Hamakaze (25 November 1940)
 (No.98)/Tanikaze (1 November 1940)
 (No.99)/Nowaki (17 September 1940)
 (No.100)/Arashi (22 April 1940)
 (No.101)/Hagikaze (18 June 1940)
 (No.102)/Maikaze (15 March 1941)
 (No.103)/Akigumo (11 April 1941)

Akizuki class (Type B) — 12 ships
The total of 12  excludes 1 uncompleted (Michitsuki) and 3 cancelled; 21 intended further ships were never ordered.

 (No.104)/Akizuki (2 July 1941)
 (No.105)/Teruzuki (21 November 1941)
 (No.106)/Suzutsuki (4 March 1942)
 (No.107)/Hatsuzuki (3 April 1942)
 (No.108)/Niizuki (29 June 1942)
 (No.109)/Wakatsuki (24 November 1942)

 Shimotsuki (7 April 1943)
 Fuyutsuki (20 January 1944)
 Harutsuki (3 August 1944)
 Yoizuki (25 September 1944)
 Natsuzuki (2 December 1944)
 Hanazuki (10 October 1944)

(Type A) — 19 ships
The total of 19 excludes 8 cancelled.

 (No.110)/Yūgumo (16 March 1941)
 (No.111)/Makigumo (5 November 1941)
 (No.112)/Kazagumo (26 September 1941)
 (No.113)/Naganami (5 March 1942)
 (No.114)/Makinami (17 December 1941)
 (No.115)/Takanami (16 March 1942)
 (No.116)/Ōnami (11 August 1942)
 (No.117)/Kiyonami (17 August 1942)
 (No.118)/Tamanami (20 December 1942)

 (No.120)/Suzunami (12 March 1943)
 (No.121)/Fujinami (20 April 1943)
 (No.122)/Hayanami (19 December 1942)
 (No.123)/Hamanami (18 April 1943)
 (No.124)/Okinami (18 July 1943)
 (No.125)/Kishinami (19 August 1943)
 (No.126)/Asashimo (18 July 1943)
 (No.127)/Hayashimo (November 1943)
 (No.128)/Akishimo (5 December 1943)
 (No.129)/Kiyoshimo (29 February 1944)

Shimakaze class (Type C) — 1 ship 
The total excludes 16 cancelled.
 (No.119)/Shimakaze (18 July 1942)

(Type D)— 18 ships 

 Matsu (3 February 1944)
 Take (28 March 1944)
 Ume (24 April 1944)
 Momo (25 March 1944)
 Kuwa (25 May 1944)
 Kiri (27 May 1944)
 Sugi (3 July 1944)
 Maki (10 June 1944)
 Momi (16 June 1944)

 Kashi (13 August 1944)
 Kaya (30 July 1944)
 Nara (12 October 1944)
 Sakura (6 September 1944)
 Yanagi (25 November 1944)
 Tsubaki (30 September 1944)
 Hinoki (4 July 1944)
 Kaede (25 July 1944)
 Keyaki (30 September 1944)

(Modified Matsu - Type D Kai) — 23 ships 
The total includes 9 never completed but excludes cancelled units

 Kaki (11 December 1944)
 Kaba (27 February 1945)
 Tachibana (14 October 1944)
 Tsuta (2 November 1944)
 Hagi (27 November 1944)
 Sumire (27 December 1944)
 Kusunoki (18 January 1945)
 Hatsuzakura (10 February 1945)
 Nire (25 November 1944)
 Nashi (17 January 1945) - was sunk during the war but was later refloated as JDS Wakaba of the JMSDF
 Enoki (27 January 1945)
 Odake (10 March 1945)
 Hatsuume (25 April 1945)
 Shii (13 January 1945)

 Yaezakura (17 March 1945) - not completed, construction stopped 23 June 1945
 Tochi (28 May 1945) - not completed, construction stopped 18 May 1945
 Katsura (23 June 1945) - not completed, construction stopped 23 June 1945
 Azusa - not launched, construction stopped 17 April 1945
 Sakaki - not launched, construction stopped 17 April 1945 
 Hishi - not launched, construction stopped 17 April 1945
 Wakazakura not launched, construction stopped 11 May 1945
 Kuzu - not launched - construction stopped 17 April 1945
 Yadake - (1 May 1945 to clear slip) - not completed, construction stopped 17 April 1945

Japan Maritime Self-Defense Force

Standard Destroyer 

/ (DD) — 2 ships transferred 1954 from USA

 DD-181 Asakaze (ex USS Ellyson - launched 26 July 1941)

 DD-182 Hatakaze (ex USS Macomb - launched 23 September 1941)

/ (DD) — 2 ships transferred 1959 from USA

 DD-183 Ariake (ex USS Heywood L. Edwards - launched 6 October 1943)

 DD-184 Yūgure (ex USS Richard P. Leary - launched 6 October 1943)

 (DD) — 2 ships

 DD-101 Harukaze (20 September 1955)

 DD-102 Yukikaze (20 August 1955)

 (DDK) — 7 ships

 DD-103 Ayanami (1 June 1957)
 DD-104 Isonami (30 September 1957)
 DD-105 Uranami (29 August 1957)
 DD-106 Shikanami (25 September 1957)

 DD-110 Takanami (8 August 1959)
 DD-111 Ōnami (13 February 1960)
 DD-112 Makinami (25 April 1960)

Murasame class (1958) (DDA) — 3 ships

 DDA-107 Murasame (31 July 1958)
 DDA-108 Yūdachi (31 July 1958)

 DDA-109 Harusame (18 June 1959)

Akizuki class (1959) (DD) — 2 ships

 DD-161 Akizuki (26 June 1959)

 DD-162 Teruzuki (24 June 1959)

 (DDK) — 6 ships

 DDK-113 Yamagumo (27 February 1965)
 DDK-114 Makigumo (26 July 1967)
 DDK-115 Asagumo (25 November 1966)

 DDK-119 Aokumo (30 March 1972)
 DDK-120 Akigumo (23 October 1973)
 DDK-121 Yūgumo (21 May 1977)

 (DDA) — 4 ships

 DDA-164 Takatsuki (7 January 1966)
 DDA-165 Kikuzuki (25 March 1967)

 DDA-166 Mochizuki (15 March 1968)
 DDA-167 Nagatsuki (19 March 1979)

 (DDK) — 3 ships

 DDK-116 Minegumo (16 December 1967)
 DDK-117 Natsugumo (25 July 1968)

 DDK-118 Murakumo (15 November 1969)

 (DD) — 12 ships

 DD-122 Hatsuyuki (7 November 1980)
 DD-123 Shirayuki (4 August 1981)
 DD-124 Mineyuki (19 October 1982)
 DD-125 Sawayuki (21 June 1982)
 DD-126 Hamayuki (27 May 1982)
 DD-127 Isoyuki (19 September 1983)

 DD-128 Haruyuki (6 September 1983)
 DD-129 Yamayuki (10 July 1984)
 DD-130 Matsuyuki (25 October 1984)
 DD-131 Setoyuki (3 July 1985)
 DD-132 Asayuki (16 October 1985)
 DD-133 Shimayuki (29 January 1986)

 (DD) — 8 ships

 DD-151 Asagiri (19 September 1986)
 DD-152 Yamagiri (10 October 1987)
 DD-153 Yūgiri (21 September 1987)
 DD-154 Amagiri (9 September 1987)

 DD-155 Hamagiri (4 June 1988)
 DD-156 Setogiri (12 September 1988)
 DD-157 Sawagiri (25 December 1988)
 DD-158 Umigiri (11 September 1989)

Murasame class (1994) (DD) — 9 ships

(orders for 5 more were replaced by those for the succeeding Takanami class)

 DD-101 Murasame (23 August 1994)
 DD-102 Harusame (16 October 1995)
 DD-103 Yudachi (19 August 1997)
 DD-104 Kirisame (21 August 1997)
 DD-105 Inazuma (9 September 1998)

 DD-106 Samidare (24 September 1998)
 DD-107 Ikazuchi (24 June 1999)
 DD-108 Akebono (25 September 2000)
 DD-109 Ariake (16 October 2000)

 (DD) — 5 ships

 DD-110 Takanami (26 July 2001)
 DD-111 Ōnami (20 September 2001)
 DD-112 Makinami (8 August 2002)

 DD-113 Sazanami (29 August 2003)
 DD-114 Suzunami (26 August 2004)

Akizuki class (DD) — 4 ships

 DD-115 Akizuki (13 October 2010)
 DD-116 Teruzuki (15 September 2011)

 DD-117 Suzutsuki (17 October 2012)
 DD-118 Fuyuzuki (22 August 2012)

Asahi class (DD) — 2 ships

 DD-119 Asahi (19 October 2016)

 DD-120 Shiranui (12 October 2017)

Guided Missile Destroyer 

 (DDG) — 1 ship
 DDG-163 Amatsukaze (5 October 1963)
 (DDG) — 3 ships

 DDG-168 Tachikaze
 DDG-169 Asakaze

 DDG-170 Sawakaze

 (DDG) — 2 ships

 DDG-171 Hatakaze (9 November 1984)

 DDG-172 Shimakaze (30 January 1987)

 (DDG) — 4 ships

 DDG-173 Kongō (20 September 1991)
 DDG-174 Kirishima (19 August 1993)

 DDG-175 Myōkō (5 October 1994)
 DDG-176 Chōkai (27 August 1996)

 (DDG) — 2 ships

 DDG-177 Atago (24 August 2005)

 DDG-178 Ashigara (30 August 2006)

 (DDG) — 2 ships

 DDG-179 Maya (30 July 2018)

 DDG-180 Haguro (17 July 2019)

Helicopter Destroyer 

 (DDH) — 2 ships

 DDH-141 Haruna (1 February 1972)

 DDH-142 Hiei (13 August 1973)

 (DDH) — 2 ships

 DDH-143 Shirane (18 September 1978)

 DDH-144 Kurama (20 September 1979)

 (DDH) — 2 ships

 DDH-181 Hyuga (23 August 2007)

 DDH-182 Ise (21 August 2009)

 (DDH) — 2 ships

(Re-designated as multi-purpose operation destroyer)

 DDH-183 Izumo (6 August 2013)

 DDH-184 Kaga (27 August 2015)

Small Escort 

Tachibana class  — 1 ship
DE-261 Wakaba (formerly IJN destroyer Nashi)
 (DE) — 2 ships transferred 1955 from USA

 DE-262 Asahi (ex USS Amick - launch 27 May 1943)

 DE-263 Hatsuhi (ex USS Atherton - launch 27 May 1943)

 (DE) - 1 ship

 DE-201 Akebono (30 October 1955)
 (DE) — 2 ships

 DE-202 Ikazuchi (6 September 1955)

 DE-203 Inazuma (4 August 1955)

 (DE)— 4 ships

 DE-211 Isuzu (17 January 1961)
 DE-212 Mogami (7 March 1961)

 DE-213 Kitakami (21 June 1963)
 DE-214 Ōi (15 June 1963)

 (DE)— 11 ships

 DE-215 Chikugo (13 January 1970)
 DE-216 Ayase (16 September 1970)
 DE-217 Mikuma (16 February 1971)
 DE-218 Tokashi (25 November 1971)
 DE-219 Iwase (29 June 1972)
 DE-220 Chitose (25 January 1973)

 DE-221 Noyodo (28 August 1973)
 DE-222 Teshio (29 May 1974)
 DE-223 Yoshino (22 August 1974)
 DE-224 Kumano (24 February 1975)
 DE-225 Noshiro (23 December 1976)

 (DE) - 1 ship

 DE-226 Ishikari (18 March 1980)

 (DE)— 2 ships

 DE-227 Yūbari (22 February 1982)

 DE-228 Yūbetsu (25 January 1983)

 (DE)— 6 ships

 DE-229 Abukuma (21 December 1988)
 DE-230 Jintsū (31 January 1989)
 DE-231 Ōyodo (19 December 1989)

 DE-232 Sendai (26 January 1990)
 DE-233 Chikuma (25 January 1992)
 DE-234 Tone (6 December 1991)

 (FFM)— 6 ships

(2 ships completed, 4 ships are under construction, 2 more ordered and with plan to construct a total of 22 ships)

 FFM-1 Mogami (2022)
 FFM-2 Kumano (2022)
 FFM-3 Noshiro (2022)
 FFM-4 Mikuma (2022)

 FFM-5 Yahagi (2022)
 FFM-6 Under construction.
 FFM7-8 On order

References

Jentschura, Hansgeorg & Jung, Dieter & Mickel, Peter. Warships of the Imperial Japanese Navy, 1869-1945. Arms & Armour Press, 1977. .
Stille, Mark. Imperial Japanese Navy Destroyers 1919-45 (1) - Minekaze to Shiratsuyu Classes. Osprey Publishing (No. 198), 2013. 
Stille, Mark. Imperial Japanese Navy Destroyers 1919-45 (2) - Asashio to Tachibana Classes. Osprey Publishing (No. 202), 2013. 
Stille, Mark. Imperial Japanese Navy Antisubmarine Escorts 1941-45. Osprey Publishing (No. 248), 2017. 
Watts, Anthony J. Japanese Warships of World War II. Ian Allan Ltd, London, 1966.
Whitley, M. J. Destroyers of World War Two: An International Encyclopedia. Arms & Armour Press, 2000. .

Destroyers of Japan
Japan
Destroyer